Carol Ann Shields,  (née Warner; June 2, 1935 – July 16, 2003) was an American-born Canadian novelist and short story writer. She is best known for her 1993 novel The Stone Diaries, which won the U.S. Pulitzer Prize for Fiction as well as the Governor General's Award in Canada.

Early life and education

Shields was born Carol Ann Warner in Oak Park, Illinois. She studied at Hanover College, in Indiana, where she became a member of the Alpha Delta Pi sorority.  A United Nations scholarship encouraged Shields to spend a junior year abroad 1955–1956 at the University of Exeter in England.  Shields did post-graduate work at the University of Ottawa, where she received an MA in 1975.

In 1955, while on British Council sponsored study week in Scotland, she met a Canadian engineering student, Donald Hugh Shields. The couple married in 1957 and moved to Canada, where they had a son and four daughters. Shields later became a Canadian citizen.

Career
In 1973, Shields became editorial assistant for the journal Canadian Slavonic Papers while living in Ottawa 1968–1978. Her first novel, Small Ceremonies, was published in 1976, followed by The Box Garden in 1977. That year she worked as a sessional lecturer in the English Department at the University of Ottawa. She taught Creative Writing at the University of British Columbia while living in Vancouver from 1978 to 1980.

Shields' third novel, Happenstance, was published in 1980; that year, she and her husband settled in Winnipeg, Manitoba, after he was hired to teach in the University of Manitoba's Faculty of Engineering. It was here that Shields wrote her better-known books.

From the fall of 1982 onward, Shields taught in the English Department at the University of Manitoba, first as an Assistant Professor (1982–1992), then as an Associate Professor (1992–1995). She published the novel Swann in 1987, and The Republic of Love in 1992. The Stone Diaries (1993) won the 1995 Pulitzer Prize for Fiction and the 1993 Governor General's Award, the only book to have ever received both awards. It won the U.S. National Book Critics Circle Award in 1994, and was nominated in 1993 for the Booker Prize.  The Stone Diaries was named one of the best books of the year by Publishers Weekly. It was also chosen as a "Notable Book" by The New York Times Book Review, which wrote "The Stone Diaries reminds us again why literature matters."

Shields was made Full Professor of English in 1995, and, in 1996, she became chancellor of the University of Winnipeg.

Shields was the author of several short story collections, including Various Miracles (1985), The Orange Fish (1989), and Dressing Up for the Carnival (2000).   She was the recipient of a Canada Council Major Award, two National Magazine Awards, the 1990 Marian Engel Award, the Canadian Authors Award, and a CBC short story award. She was appointed as an officer of the Order of Canada in 1998 and was elevated to companion of the Order in 2002. Shields was also a fellow of the Royal Society of Canada and a member of the Order of Manitoba.

Carol Shields won the 1998 Orange Prize for Fiction for her 1997 novel Larry's Party. Her last novel, Unless (2002), was nominated for the 2002 Giller Prize, the Governor General of Canada Literary Award, the Booker Prize and the 2003 Orange Prize for Fiction. It was awarded the Ethel Wilson Fiction Prize.
On retirement in 2000, Shields became Professor Emerita at the University of Manitoba. That year, after Don's retirement, the couple moved to Victoria, British Columbia.

Shields also studied the works of Jane Austen. She wrote the biography entitled Jane Austen, which won the $25,000 Charles Taylor Prize for literary non-fiction in April 2002, an award accepted by her daughter Meg on her behalf in Toronto, on April 22, 2002.

Her last novel, Unless, contains a passionate defense of female writers who write of 'domestic' subjects.

Carol Shields wrote plays including Departures and Arrivals which has been performed hundreds of times by both amateur and professional theaters. Other celebrated plays include Thirteen Hand (1993), Fashion, Power, Guilt, and the Charity of Families (co-authored with daughter Catherine Shields)(1995), and Unless (with daughter Sara Cassidy)(2005).  Collections of poems by Shields were published in 1972 Others, 1974 Intersect, and 1992 Coming to Canada.

Two collections of essays written by women about what they were not told became best sellers in Canada.  Dropped Threads (2001) and Dropped Threads 2 (2003) were edited by Shields and her friend and colleague Marjorie Anderson.

Death and legacy
Shields died in 2003 of breast cancer at age 68 in Victoria.

Following her death, six of her short stories were adapted by Shaftesbury Films into the dramatic anthology series The Shields Stories.  Her earlier short story collections were republished as Collected Stories of Carol Shields in 2005. Films based on Carol Shields's novels include Swann (1996) and The Republic of Love (2003). Her final novel, Unless, was adapted as a play in 2016 by Alan Gilsenan.

Shields' eldest daughter, Anne Giardini, is also a writer. Giardini has contributed to the National Post as a columnist, and has published her first novel, The Sad Truth About Happiness. Anne's second novel, Advice for Italian Boys, was published in 2009. Giardini and her son, Nicholas, edited a book of Shields' thoughts and advice on writing, Startle and Illuminate, published in 2016.

Shields' youngest daughter, Sara Cassidy, has published many children's books and young adult novels, including Slick (2010), Windfall (2011), A Boy Named Queen (2016), and Nevers (2019), which was nominated for the Governor General's Award for young people's literature.

In 2020, the Carol Shields Prize for Fiction was announced as a new literary award to honour writing by Canadian and American women.

Honours and awards
the Canadian Authors' Association Award for the Best Novel of 1976 (Small Ceremonies)
the Arthur Ellis Award for Best Canadian Mystery (Swann: A Mystery)
the Booker Prize Shortlist (The Stone Diaries'; Unless""')
the Governor General's Award (The Stone Diaries)
the National Book Critics Circle Award (The Stone Diaries)
the Pulitzer Prize (The Stone Diaries)
the Orange Prize (Larry's Party)
the Charles Taylor Prize for Literary Non-Fiction (Jane Austen)
nominations for the Giller Prize (Larry's Party and Unless)
 the Golden Plate Award of the American Academy of Achievement

Bibliography

Novels
Small Ceremonies, 1976 (winner of the Canadian Authors Association Award)
The Box Garden, 1977 (Later published in a joint edition with Small Ceremonies as Duet)
Happenstance, 1980
A Fairly Conventional Woman, 1982  (Later published as a joint edition with Happenstance as Happenstance)
Swann: A Mystery, 1987 (UK title: Mary Swann), (Arthur Ellis Award for Best Canadian Mystery, 1988)
A Celibate Season, 1991 (with Blanche Howard)
The Republic of Love, 1992
The Stone Diaries, 1993 (winner of the Governor General's Award, National Book Critics Circle Award, and the Pulitzer Prize)
Larry's Party, 1997 (winner of the Orange Prize, and Le Grand Prix du livre de Montréal)
Unless, 2002 (winner of the Ethel Wilson Fiction Prize, shortlisted in 2002 Man Booker Prize and Giller Prize, and shortlisted in 2003 for the Orange Prize)

Graphic novels 

 Susanna Moodie: Roughing it in the Bush, 2016 (with Patrick Crowe and art by Selena Goulding)

Short stories
Various Miracles, 1985
The Orange Fish, 1989
Dressing Up for the Carnival, 2000
Collected Stories, 2004.

Poetry
Others, Ottawa: Borealis Press, 1972.
Intersect, Ottawa: Borealis Press, 1974.
Coming to Canada, Ottawa: Carleton University Press, 1992.

Plays
Departures and Arrivals, 1990
Thirteen Hands, 1993
Fashion Power Guilt and the Charity of Families, 1995 (with Catherine Shields)
Anniversary: A Comedy, 1998 (with Dave Williamson)
Women Waiting, 1983
Unless, 2005
Larry's Party - the Musical, 2000 (adapted by Richard Ouzounian with music by Marek Norman)
Thirteen Hands and Other Plays. Toronto: Vintage, 2002.

Criticism
Susanna Moodie: Voice and Vision, 1976

Biography
Jane Austen. New York: Viking, 2001.

Anthologies
Dropped Threads: What We aren't Told. Toronto: Vintage, 2001. (edited with Marjorie Anderson)
Dropped Threads 2: More of What We aren't Told. Toronto: Vintage, 2003. (edited with Marjorie Anderson)

Movies
Swann 1996
The Republic of Love 2003

References

External links

The Carol Shields Literary Trust
"Carol Shields" in Canadian Writers: an examination of archival manuscripts, typescripts, correspondence, journals and notebooks at Library and Archives Canada
Carol Shields's entry in The Canadian Encyclopedia
CBC Obituary
Observer Interview with Carol Shields
Profile in the Manitoba Author Publication Index

The Carol Shields Memorial Labyrinth
The archives of Carol Shields (Carol Shields fonds, R11805) are held at Library and Archives Canada

1935 births
2003 deaths
20th-century American novelists
21st-century American novelists
20th-century American poets
Alumni of the University of Exeter
American emigrants to Canada
American women short story writers
American women novelists
Canadian biographers
Canadian women novelists
Canadian women poets
Canadian women short story writers
Canadian socialists
Deaths from cancer in British Columbia
Companions of the Order of Canada
Deaths from breast cancer
Fellows of the Royal Society of Canada
Governor General's Award-winning fiction writers
Hanover College alumni
Members of the Order of Manitoba
Writers from Oak Park, Illinois
Writers from Winnipeg
Pulitzer Prize for Fiction winners
Academic staff of the University of Manitoba
University of Ottawa alumni
20th-century Canadian novelists
21st-century Canadian novelists
20th-century Canadian poets
American women poets
20th-century Canadian women writers
21st-century Canadian women writers
21st-century American poets
20th-century American biographers
American women biographers
21st-century American biographers
20th-century Canadian short story writers
21st-century Canadian short story writers
20th-century American short story writers
21st-century American short story writers
Novelists from Illinois
20th-century American essayists
21st-century American essayists
Canadian women non-fiction writers
Historians from Illinois
21st-century American women writers
20th-century American women